The Women's 100 metre freestyle S12 swimming event at the 2004 Summer Paralympics was competed on 24 September. It was won by Zhu Hong Yan, representing .

1st round

Heat 1
24 Sept. 2004, morning session

Heat 2
24 Sept. 2004, morning session

Final round

24 Sept. 2004, evening session

References

W
2004 in women's swimming